Cold Front may refer to:

Cold front, a weather event
Cold Front (Star Trek: Enterprise)
Cold Front (G.I. Joe)
Cold Front (film)
Cold front, a song from the Terraria mod Calamity